Amanda Coetzer was the defending champion but did not compete that year.

Seventh-seeded Virginia Ruano Pascual won in the final 6–4, 4–6, 6–3 against Silvia Farina.

Seeds
A champion seed is indicated in bold text while text in italics indicates the round in which that seed was eliminated.

  Sandrine Testud (quarterfinals)
  Dominique Van Roost (first round)
  Silvia Farina (final)
  Anne-Gaëlle Sidot (first round)
  Sarah Pitkowski (semifinals)
  Fang Li (semifinals)
  Virginia Ruano Pascual (champion)
  María Sánchez Lorenzo (quarterfinals)

Draw

External links
 1998 Budapest Lotto Open draw

Budapest Grand Prix
1998 WTA Tour